Sahitya Kala Parishad (साहित्य कला परिषद) (Academy of Performing and Fine Arts) is the Cultural wing of the Govt. of National Capital Territory of Delhi (NCT) of Delhi for music, dance, drama & fine arts, established in 1968, under the 'Department Of Art, Culture And Language'. It was registered under the Society's Registration Act, 1860 on 31 July 1975. 

It works towards fostering, visual arts and inculcate artistic awareness within the NCT of Delhi. As a norm, the Chief Minister of Delhi, remains the Chairperson of the Sahitya Kala Parishad. After, the establishment of Language Academies, like the Sahitya Akademi, its focus has been mainly on performing and visual arts. It has also set up two 'District Cultural Centres', one at Janakpuri and other in Vikaspuri (Bodella Village) in Delhi, the latter set up in collaboration with Delhi Public Library has two auditoria.

Location
18-A, Satsang Vihar Marg, Spl. Institutional Area New Delhi-110067

Activities

Language Academies
The Parishad has over the year established several language academies to promote literature in diverse languages of the state, with the most recent academy, the Maithili- Bhojpuri Academy established on 7 January 2008.

 Hindi Academy (since 1981)
 Punjabi Academy (since 1981)
 Sanskrit Academy (since 1987)
 Sindhi Academy (since 1994)
 Urdu Academy (since 1981)
 Maithili-Bhojpuri Academy (since 2008)

Awards
Each year, the Parishad gives Awards for excellence in the field of Performing and Visual Arts, as well as Literature:
 Parishad Samman (Sahitya Kala Parishad Samman)
 Mohan Rakesh Samman

Scholarships
Each year, Sahitya Kala Parishad awards, two-year Scholarships for Advance Training in Music

Festival

Theatre
 Bhartendu Natya Utsav 
 Nakhat Utsav

Music and Dance
 Children Jhankar Utsav 
 Indraprastha Sangeet Samaroh 
 Uday Shankar Nritya Samaroh 
 Baisakhi Festival 
 Qutub Festival

Fine Arts
 Annual Art Exhibition 
 Sponsored Art Exhibition 
 Exhibition of children's work 
 Artists Camp

Films
 Asian Film Festival,  Films from across Asia, are screened at different venues in New Delhi.

See also 
 Manipuri Sahitya Parishad
 Sahitya Akademi

References

External links
 Sahitya Kala Parishad Homepage
 Department Of Art, Culture And Language, Govt. of NCT of Delhi
 R K Films & Media Academy, New Delhi - Training School of Acting & Performing Arts Homepage
 Academy of Fine Arts and Literature New Delhi at Google Cultural Institute

State agencies of Delhi
Organisations based in Delhi
Indic literature societies
Culture of Delhi
Arts organisations based in India
Arts councils
Performing arts in India
Arts organizations established in 1968